Anne P. Jones (born February 9, 1935) is an American attorney who served as a Commissioner of the Federal Communications Commission from 1979 to 1983.

References

1935 births
Living people
Members of the Federal Communications Commission
Massachusetts Republicans
Carter administration personnel
Reagan administration personnel